Metallaxis amandae is a species of moth of the family Geometridae. It is found in Borneo in lower montane forest. Its ground colour is grey with pale markings.

References

Rhodostrophiini
Moths described in 1997